A Few Moments with Eddie Cantor also known as A Few Moments with Eddie Cantor, Star of "Kid Boots" is an early sound film made in Lee De Forest's sound-on-film Phonofilm process in late 1923 or early 1924 starring Eddie Cantor in an excerpt from the Broadway show Kid Boots. Some sources say the film premiered at the Rivoli Theater in New York City on April 15, 1923. However, Kid Boots opened on Broadway somewhat later, on December 31, 1923.

It contains two songs: "The Dumber They Are, the Better I Like 'Em," and "Oh, Gee, Georgie."  The rest of the recorded material would be considered standup comedy. In all, the recording is nearly seven minutes long.

The music was orchestrated by George Olsen.

External links
 
 
 
 
 A Few Moments With Eddie Cantor at SilentEra.com
 

1923 films
1920s musical comedy films
American musical comedy films
American black-and-white films
1920s English-language films
Phonofilm short films
American short films
1923 comedy films
Early sound films
1920s American films